Motown Chartbusters is a series of compilation albums first released by EMI under licence on the Tamla Motown label in Britain. In total, 12 editions were released in the UK between 1967 and 1982. Volumes 1 and 2 were originally called British Motown Chartbusters; after this the title Motown Chartbusters was used.

Background
Early Motown Records releases in Britain were not on the Motown label, but were issued on the London, Fontana, Oriole and Stateside labels.  In 1964, Motown's first number 1 in Britain was "Baby Love" by the Supremes, released on EMI's  Stateside label. "Where Did Our Love Go" by the Supremes, and "My Guy" by Mary Wells were amongst other big hits in the same year, also on Stateside. The first release on the Tamla Motown label was "Stop In The Name Of Love" by the Supremes, in March 1965.

By 1964, Motown had accumulated enough British hits for EMI to release a greatest hits album, A Collection of Tamla Motown Big Hits.  Over the next few years, several more compilations were released, including six in the series 16 Original Big Hits.  In 1967, the label issued the first of the Motown Chartbusters series.  Although the series comprised mainly hit singles by various Motown artists, the albums also included other recordings that had not been hits in Britain and many significant single hits were excluded from the series. Later albums in the series failed to include any of the top ten singles achieved by Stevie Wonder, or any of his releases. Minor hits were sometimes included in place of bigger hits, most notably for the Jackson 5 and Michael Jackson. Because of Motown's policy of re-issuing tracks on single on a regular basis, there are some anomalies in the inclusion of tracks. Jimmy Ruffin's 'What Becomes of the Broken Hearted?' is included in both Volume 1 and Volume 9, as it was a UK hit single twice. Mary Wells' hit 'My Guy' features on Volume 7, released in 1972, after it had been a substantive reissue hit, despite being first released in 1964 and similarly 'Baby Love' is included on Volume 9, as it had been re-issued in 1974, ten years after it first charted in the UK for The Supremes.

The original albums were made by EMI under licence from Motown. EMI also made 8-track cartridge recordings of the early releases.  In total, 12 editions were released in the UK, spanning 15 years from 1967 to 1982.

The first nine albums were Top 15 UK chart entries, whereas the later albums from 10-12 didn't chart at all. The second volume of British Motown Chartbusters rose to No. 8 in January 1970. In the same year, Volume 3 spent six weeks at the No. 2 position, eventually reaching No. 1. Volumes 4 and 5 also hit No. 1. In 1971 Volume 6 went to No. 2 and, in 1972 and 1973, both Volumes 7 and 8 went to No. 9.

The series was the most successful set of compilation albums in terms of sales until the release of the Now That's What I Call Music series began in the mid-1980s.  A compilation album, Now That's What I Call Motown, was released on the Universal Motown label.

The series was re-issued by the budget label Spectrum, starting in 1997. The clear differences between the two releases are the logos on the disc and cover: the original release has the Tamla Motown logo; the re-release has the Motown logo.

After its success in the UK, Motown went on to release variants of the compilation format in other counties such as the United States and Australia.  There were also various releases on the same type of platform, such as Motown Chartbusters, 150 Hits of Gold and boxed sets.

British Motown Chartbusters

Motown Chartbusters Volume 1

First released in October 1967 as British Motown Chartbusters.
It was re-released on the Spectrum label, and renamed Motown Chartbusters Volume 1

Track Listing
 "Blowin' in the Wind" – Stevie Wonder
 "You Keep Me Hangin' On" – The Supremes
 "Standing in the Shadows of Love" – The Four Tops
 "It Takes Two" – Marvin Gaye & Kim Weston
 "When You're Young and in Love" – The Marvelettes
 "(I Know) I'm Losing You" – The Temptations
 "What Becomes of the Brokenhearted" – Jimmy Ruffin
 "The Happening" – The Supremes
 "7-Rooms of Gloom" – The Four Tops
 "How Sweet It Is (To Be Loved by You)" – Jr. Walker & the All Stars
 "I'm Ready for Love" – Martha & the Vandellas
 "Love Is Here and Now You're Gone" – The Supremes
 "Gonna Give Her All the Love I've Got" – Jimmy Ruffin
 "I Was Made to Love Her" – Stevie Wonder
 "Take Me in Your Arms and Love Me" – Gladys Knight & the Pips
 "Jimmy Mack" – Martha & the Vandellas

Charts

Certifications

Telstar release

Universal Music release

Motown Chartbusters Volume 2

First released in November 1968 as British Motown Chartbusters Volume 2.
It was re-released on the Spectrum label, and renamed Motown Chartbusters Volume 2

Track Listing

 "Ain't Nothing Like the Real Thing" – Marvin Gaye & Tammi Terrell
 "Reflections" – Diana Ross & the Supremes
 "If You Can Want" – Smokey Robinson & the Miracles
 "You Keep Running Away" – The Four Tops
 "I Could Never Love Another (After Loving You)" – The Temptations
 "I Heard It Through the Grapevine" – Gladys Knight & the Pips
 "I'm Wondering" – Stevie Wonder
 "I've Passed This Way Before" – Jimmy Ruffin
 "Some Things You Never Get Used To" – Diana Ross & the Supremes
 "Gotta See Jane" – R. Dean Taylor
 "Shoo-Be-Doo-Be-Doo-Da-Day" – Stevie Wonder
 "You're My Everything" – The Temptations
 "Honey Chile" – Martha Reeves & the Vandellas
 "If I Were a Carpenter" – The Four Tops
 "I Second That Emotion" – Smokey Robinson & the Miracles
 "If I Could Build My Whole World Around You" – Marvin Gaye & Tammi Terrell

Charts

Motown Chartbusters Volume 3

First released in November 1969.

Track Listing

 "I Heard It Through the Grapevine" – Marvin Gaye
 "I'm Gonna Make You Love Me" – Diana Ross & the Supremes and the Temptations
 "My Cherie Amour" – Stevie Wonder
 "This Old Heart of Mine (Is Weak for You)" – The Isley Brothers
 "I'll Pick a Rose for My Rose" – Marv Johnson
 "No Matter What Sign You Are" –  Diana Ross & the Supremes
 "I'm in a Different World" – The Four Tops
 "Dancing in the Street" – Martha Reeves & the Vandellas
 "For Once in My Life" – Stevie Wonder
 "You're All I Need to Get By" – Marvin Gaye & Tammi Terrell
 "Get Ready" – The Temptations
 "Stop Her on Sight (S.O.S.)" – Edwin Starr
 "Love Child" – Diana Ross & the Supremes
 "Behind a Painted Smile" – The Isley Brothers
 "(I'm a) Road Runner" – Jr. Walker & the All Stars
 "The Tracks of My Tears" – Smokey Robinson & The Miracles

Charts

Certifications

Motown Chartbusters Volume 4

First released in October 1970.

Track Listing
 "I Want You Back" – The Jackson 5
 "The Onion Song" – Marvin Gaye & Tammi Terrell
 "I Can't Help Myself (Sugar Pie Honey Bunch)" – The Four Tops
 "Up the Ladder to the Roof" – The Supremes
 "I Can't Get Next to You" – The Temptations
 "Too Busy Thinking About My Baby" – Marvin Gaye
 "Yester-Me, Yester-You, Yesterday" – Stevie Wonder
 "Someday We'll Be Together" – Diana Ross & the Supremes
 "ABC" – The Jackson 5
 "Never Had a Dream Come True" – Stevie Wonder
 "Farewell Is a Lonely Sound" – Jimmy Ruffin
 "Do What You Gotta Do" – The Four Tops
 "I Second That Emotion" – Diana Ross & the Supremes with the Temptations
 "Cloud Nine" – The Temptations
 "What Does It Take (To Win Your Love)" – Jr. Walker & the All Stars
 "Reach Out and Touch (Somebody's Hand)" – Diana Ross

Charts

Certifications

Motown Chartbusters Volume 5

First released in April 1971.

Track Listing
 "The Tears of a Clown" – Smokey Robinson & the Miracles
 "War" – Edwin Starr
 "The Love You Save" – The Jackson 5
 "Ball of Confusion (That's What the World Is Today)" – The Temptations
 "It's All in the Game" – The Four Tops
 "Heaven Help Us All" – Stevie Wonder
 "It's Wonderful" – Jimmy Ruffin
 "Ain't No Mountain High Enough" – Diana Ross
 "Signed, Sealed, Delivered I'm Yours" – Stevie Wonder
 "Stoned Love" – The Supremes
 "Abraham, Martin and John" – Marvin Gaye
 "Still Water (Love)" – The Four Tops
 "Forget Me Not" – Martha Reeves & the Vandellas
 "It's a Shame" – The Motown Spinners
 "I'll Be There" – The Jackson 5
 "I'll Say Forever My Love" – Jimmy Ruffin

Charts

Certifications

Motown Chartbusters Volume 6

First released in October 1971.

Track Listing

 "I'm Still Waiting" – Diana Ross
 "I Don't Blame You at All" – Smokey Robinson & the Miracles
 "We Can Work It Out" – Stevie Wonder
 "Never Can Say Goodbye" – The Jackson 5
 "These Things Will Keep Me Loving You" – The Velvelettes
 "Indiana Wants Me" – R. Dean Taylor
 "River Deep – Mountain High" – The Supremes & the Four Tops
 "Just My Imagination (Running Away with Me)" – The Temptations
 "Nathan Jones" – The Supremes
 "A Simple Game" – The Four Tops
 "Heaven Must Have Sent You" – The Elgins
 "It's Summer" – The Temptations
 "Remember Me" – Diana Ross
 "Mama's Pearl" – The Jackson 5
 "(Come 'Round Here) I'm the One You Need" – Smokey Robinson & the Miracles
 "Just Seven Numbers (Can Straighten Out My Life)" – The Four Tops

Charts

Motown Chartbusters Volume 7

First released in November 1972.

Track Listing
 "Automatically Sunshine" – The Supremes
 "Just Walk in My Shoes" – Gladys Knight & the Pips
 "Rockin' Robin" – Michael Jackson
 "Take a Look Around" – The Temptations
 "You Gotta Have Love in Your Heart" – The Supremes And The Four Tops
 "If You Really Love Me" – Stevie Wonder
 "Surrender" – Diana Ross
 "Ain't No Sunshine" – Michael Jackson
 "Superstar (Remember How You Got Where You Are)" – The Temptations
 "Bless You" – Martha Reeves & the Vandellas
 "Floy Joy" – The Supremes
 "Walk in the Night" – Jr. Walker & the All Stars
 "Doobedood'ndoobe, Doobedood'ndoobe, Doobedood'ndoo" – Diana Ross
 "Festival Time" – The San Remo Golden Strings
 "My Guy" – Mary Wells
 "Got to Be There" – Michael Jackson

Charts

Motown Chartbusters Volume 8

Track Listing
 "Superstition" – Stevie Wonder
 "Neither One of Us (Wants to Be the First to Say Goodbye)" – Gladys Knight & the Pips
 "Law of the Land" – The Temptations
 "Take Me Girl, I'm Ready" – Jr. Walker & the All Stars
 "Skywriter" – The Jackson 5
 "Touch Me in the Morning" – Diana Ross
 "The Look of Love" – Gladys Knight & the Pips
 "Morning Glow" – Michael Jackson
 "Papa Was a Rollin' Stone" – The Temptations
 "Let's Get It On" – Marvin Gaye
 "Bad Weather" – The Supremes
 "Ben" – Michael Jackson
 "You Are the Sunshine of My Life" – Stevie Wonder
 "Hallelujah Day" – The Jackson 5
 "Way Back Home" – Jr. Walker & the All Stars
 "Help Me Make It Through the Night" – Gladys Knight & the Pips

Charts

Certifications

Motown Chartbusters Volume 9

First released in October 1974.

Track Listing
 "All of My Life" – Diana Ross
 "Higher Ground" – Stevie Wonder
 "Dancing Machine" – The Jackson 5
 "My Mistake (Was to Love You)" – Diana Ross & Marvin Gaye
 "Spinnin' and Spinnin'" – Syreeta
 "Keep on Truckin'" – Eddie Kendricks
 "There's a Ghost in My House" – R. Dean Taylor
 "Just My Soul Responding" – Smokey Robinson
 "Last Time I Saw Him" – Diana Ross
 "You Are Everything" – Diana Ross & Marvin Gaye
 "He's Misstra Know-It-All" – Stevie Wonder
 "Baby Love" – Diana Ross & the Supremes
 "What Becomes of the Brokenhearted" – Jimmy Ruffin
 "Living for the City" – Stevie Wonder
 "Love Me" – Diana Ross
 "Boogie Down" – Eddie Kendricks
 "Machine Gun" – Commodores

Charts

Motown Chartbusters Volume 10

First released in November 1979.

Some of the later releases were stamped in red vinyl.

Track Listing
 "Three Times a Lady" – The Commodores
 "Love Hangover" – Diana Ross
 "The Night" – Frankie Valli & the Four Seasons
 "Got to Give It Up – Marvin Gaye
 "Get It Up for Love" – Tata Vega
 "The Boss" – Diana Ross
 "Big Time" – Smokey Robinson
 "Your Kiss Is Sweet" – Syreeta
 "Theme from Mahogany (Do You Know Where You're Going To)" – Diana Ross
 "Easy" – The Commodores
 "I'm a Sucker for Your Love" – Teena Marie
 "Love Machine" – The Miracles
 "It Should Have Been Me" – Yvonne Fair
 "You and I" – Rick James
 "Don't Leave Me This Way" – Thelma Houston
 "Sail On" – The Commodores

Motown Chartbusters Volume 11

First released in December 1980 as "Motown Chartbusters '80". Renamed for CD release later.

An album also called Motown Chartbusters '80 was released in the same year on the Astor label (6264 187) in Australia. It had the exact track listing as Motown Chartbusters Volume 11. The cover was almost identical, with just minor changes.

Track Listing

 "Upside Down" – Diana Ross
 "Behind the Groove" – Teena Marie
 "It Will Come in Time" – Billy Preston & Syreeta
 "Still" – The Commodores
 "Big Time" – Rick James
 "Make Me Yours" – High Inergy
 "Let's Get Serious" – Jermaine Jackson
 "It's My House" – Diana Ross
 "With You I'm Born Again" – Billy Preston & Syreeta
 "Burnin' Hot" – Jermaine Jackson
 "My Old Piano" – Diana Ross
 "He's Gone" – Syreeta
 "I Need Your Lovin'" – Teena Marie
 "Wonderland" – The Commodores
 "Cruisin'" – Smokey Robinson
 "The Last Song" – Lynda Carter

Motown Chartbusters Volume 12

First released in July 1982.

Track Listing
 "Being with You" – Smokey Robinson
 "Lady (You Bring Me Up)" – The Commodores
 "We're Almost There" – Michael Jackson
 "Endless Love" – Diana Ross & Lionel Richie
 "Give It to Me Baby" – Rick James
 "I'm Coming Out" – Diana Ross
 "You Like Me Don't You" – Jermaine Jackson
 "It Must Be Magic" – Teena Marie
 "Oh No" – The Commodores
 "One Day in Your Life" – Michael Jackson
 "Tenderness" – Diana Ross
 "Tell Me Tomorrow" – Smokey Robinson
 "I Wanna Be Where You Are" – José Feliciano
 "I Must Be in Love" – Syreeta
 "Why You Wanna Try Me" – The Commodores
 "Paradise in Your Eyes" – Jermaine Jackson
 "Super Freak" – Rick James
 "It's My Turn" – Diana Ross

United States Motown Chartbusters

Three years later after the first release of British Motown Chartbusters, Motown released a series called “Motown Chartbusters" on the Motown label in the United States. This consisted of only five albums which had completely different track listings to the UK releases.

Another difference was the number of tracks per album, the UK version consisted of 16 to 18 tracks, whereas the US version only had 12 tracks.

US – Motown Chartbusters Volume 1

First released in December 1970.

Track Listing

 Try It Baby – Marvin Gaye
 (I Know) I'm Losing You – Temptations
 (I'm A) Road Runner – Jr. Walker & All Stars
 You're All I Need To Get By – Marvin Gaye & Tammi Terrell
 Mickey's Monkey – Smokey Robinson & Miracles
 Back In My Arms Again – Diana Ross & Supremes
 Blowin' in the Wind – Stevie Wonder
 You've Made Me So Very Happy – Brenda Holloway
 I'm Ready For Love – Martha Reeves & Vandellas
 Ooo Baby Baby – Smokey Robinson & Miracles
 Danger Heartbreak Dead Ahead – Marvelettes
 It's Growing – Temptations

US – Motown Chartbusters Volume 2

First released in October 1970.

Track Listing

 Bernadette – Four Tops
 My Baby – Temptations
 Come See About Me – Diana Ross & Supremes
 I Want You Back – Jackson 5
 Nowhere To Run – Martha Reeves & Vandellas
 Too Many Fish In The Sea – Marvelettes
 More Love – Smokey Robinson & Miracles
 Everybody Needs Love – Gladys Knight & Pips
 What Does It Take (To Win Your Love) – Jr. Walker & All Stars
 I Wish It Would Rain – Temptations
 Hitch Hike – Marvin Gaye
 This Old Heart Of Mine (Is Weak For You) – Isley Brothers

US – Motown Chartbusters Volume 3

First released in May 1971.

Track Listing

 Up The Ladder To The Roof – Supremes
 Gotta Hold On To This Feeling – Jr. Walker & All Stars
 It's All In The Game – Four Tops
 For Once In My Life – Stevie Wonder
 Baby I'm For Real – The Originals (band)
 It's A Shame – Spinners
 Love Child – Diana Ross & Supremes
 ABC – Jackson Five
 Psychedelic Shack – Temptations
 Friendship Train – Gladys Knight & Pips
 Honey Child – Martha Reeves & Vandellas
 Twenty-Five Miles – Edwin Starr

US – Motown Chartbusters Volume 4

First released in May 1971.

Track Listing

 The Love You Save – Jackson 5
 You Need Love Like I Do (Don't You) – Gladys Knight & Pips
 Do You See My Love (For You Growing) – Jr. Walker & All Stars
 I Can't Get Next To You – Temptations
 Too Busy Thinking About My Baby – Marvin Gaye
 War – Edwin Starr
 Someday We'll Be Together – Diana Ross & Supremes
 The Tears Of A Clown – Smokey Robinson
 My Whole World Ended (The Moment You Left Me) – David Ruffin
 Signed Sealed Delivered I'm Yours – Stevie Wonder
 Still Water (Love) – Four Tops
 The Bells – The Originals

US – Motown Chartbusters Volume 5

First released in December 1971.

Track Listing

 I'll Be There – Jackson 5
 I Was Made To Love Her – Stevie Wonder
 Everybody's Got The Right To Love – Supremes
 These Eyes – Jr. Walker & All Stars
 Ain't Nothing Like The Real Thing – Marvin Gaye & Tammi Terrell
 River Deep-Mountain High – Supremes & Four Tops
 Ain't No Mountain High Enough – Diana Ross
 I Second That Emotion – Smokey Robinson & Miracles
 It's A Shame – Spinners
 Ball Of Confusion (That's What The World Is Today) – Temptations
 Does Your Mama Know About Me – Bobby Taylor & the Vancouvers
 I Love You Madly – The Fantastic Four

Boxed sets

Original British released boxed sets

Motown Chartbusters boxed set Volumes 1–3 Contains Vol 1–3
Motown Chartbusters boxed set Volumes 4–6 Contains Vol 4–6
Motown Chartbusters boxed set Volumes 1–6 Contains Vol 1–6
Motown Chartbusters boxed set Volumes 7–12 Contains Vol 7–12

Motown Chartbusters 150 Hits of gold

First released in 1985.

Track Listing

Volume 1

 Mary Wells – My Guy
 Diana Ross And The Supremes – Where Did Our Love Go
 Diana Ross And The Supremes – Baby Love
 Martha Reeves And The Vandellas – Nowhere To Run
 Diana Ross And The Supremes – Stop! In The Name Of Love
 Stevie Wonder – Uptight (Everything's Alright)
 Four Tops – Loving You Is Sweeter Than Ever
 The Temptations – Ain't Too Proud To Beg
 Jr Walker And The All Stars – How Sweet It Is (To Be Loved By You)
 Diana Ross And The Supremes – You Can't Hurry Love
 Four Tops – Reach Out I'll Be There
 The Temptations – Beauty Is Only Skin Deep
 Jimmy Ruffin – What Becomes Of The Broken Hearted
 Diana Ross And The Supremes – You Keep Me Hangin' On
 Martha Reeves And The Vandellas – I'm Ready For Love
 The Temptations – (I Know) I'm Losing You
 Stevie Wonder – A Place In The Sun
 Four Tops – Standing In The Shadows Of Love
 Marvin Gaye And Kim Weston – It Takes Two
 Diana Ross And The Supremes – Love Is Here And Now You're Gone

Volume 2

 Four Tops – Bernadette
 Martha Reeves And The Vandellas – Jimmy Mack
 Diana Ross And The Supremes – The Happening
 Four Tops – 7 Rooms Of Gloom
 Gladys Knight And The Pips – Take Me In Your Arms And Love Me
 Stevie Wonder – I Was Made To Love Her
 The Marvelettes – When You're Young And In Love
 Diana Ross And The Supremes – Reflections
 Stevie Wonder – I'm Wondering
 Diana Ross And The Supremes – In And Out Of Love
 Four Tops – Walk Away Renee
 R Dean Taylor – Gotta See Jane
 Four Tops – If I Were A Carpenter
 Marvin Gaye And Tammi Terrell – You're All I Need To Get By
 Four Tops – Yesterday's Dreams
 Isley Brothers – This Old Heart Of Mine (Is Weak For You)
 Diana Ross And The Supremes – Love Child
 Stevie Wonder – For Once In My Life
 Edwin Starr – Stop Her On Sight (S.O.S.)
 Isley Brothers – I Guess I'll Always Love You

Volume 3

 Martha Reeves And The Vandellas – Dancing In The Street
 Marvin Gaye And Tammi Terrell – You Ain't Livin' Till You're Lovin'
 Mary Johnson – I'll Pick A Rose For My Rose
 Diana Ross And The Supremes And The Temptations – I'm Gonna Make You Love Me
 Marvin Gaye – I Heard It Through The Breakdown
 The Temptations – Get Ready
 Stevie Wonder – Don't Know Why I Love You
 Jr Walker And The All Stars – (I'm A) Road Runner
 Isley Brothers – Behind A Painted Smile
 Diana Ross And The Supremes – I'm Livin' In Shame
 Smokey Robinson And The Miracles – The Tracks Of My Tears
 Four Tops – What Is A Man
 Stevie Wonder – My Cherie Amour
 Marvin Gaye – Too Busy Thinking About My Baby
 The Temptations – Cloud Nine
 Isley Brothers – Put Yourself In My Place
 Diana Ross And The Supremes And The Temptations – I Second That Emotion
 Four Tops – Do What You Gotta Do
 Jr Walker And The All Stars – What Does It Take
 Stevie Wonder – Yester-Me, Yester-You, Yesterday

Volume 4

 Diana Ross And The Supremes – Someday We'll Be Together
 Marvin Gaye And Tammi Terrell – The Onion Song
 The Temptations – I Can't Get Next To You
 Jackson 5 – I Want You Back
 Jimmy Ruffin – Farewell Is A Lonely Sound
 Four Tops – I Can't Help Myself
 Stevie Wonder – Never Had A Dream Come True
 The Supremes – Up The Ladder To The Roof
 Jackson 5 – ABC
 Marvin Gaye – Abraham, Martin And John
 Four Tops – It's All In The Game
 Jimmy Ruffin – I'll Say Forever My Love
 Stevie Wonder – Signed, Sealed, Delivered I'm Yours
 Jackson 5 – The Love You Save
 Smokey Robinson And The Miracles – The Tears Of A Clown
 Diana Ross – Ain't No Mountain High Enough
 The Temptations – Ball Of Confusion (That's What The World Is Today)
 Four Tops – Still Water (Love)
 Jimmy Ruffin – It's Wonderful (To Be Loved By You)
 Edwin Starr – War

Volume 5

 Jackson 5 – I'll Be There
 Detroit Spinners – It's A Shame
 The Supremes – Stoned Love
 Smokey Robinson And The Miracles – (Come Round Here) I'm The One You Need
 Martha Reeves And The Vandellas – Forget Me Not
 Diana Ross – Remember Me
 R Dean Taylor – Indiana Wants Me
 The Elgins – Heaven Must Have Sent You
 Smokey Robinson And The Miracles – I Don't Blame You At All
 The Temptations – Just My Imagination (Running Away With Me)
 The Supremes And Four Tops – River Deep – Mountain High
 Diana Ross – I'm Still Waiting
 The Supremes – Nathan Jones
 Four Tops – Simple Game
 Diana Ross – Surrender
 Stevie Wonder – If You Really Love Me
 Michael Jackson – Got To Be There
 The Supremes – Floy Joy

Volume 6

 The Temptations – Take A Look Around
 Diana Ross – Doobedood'ndoobe, Doobedood'ndoobe, Doobedood'ndoo
 Michael Jackson – Rockin' Robin
 The Supremes – Automatically Sunshine
 Michael Jackson – Ain't No Sunshine
 Jr Walker And The All Stars – Walk In The Night
 Jackson 5 – Lookin' Through The Windows
 Michael Jackson – Ben
 Gladys Knight And The Pips – Help Me Make It Through The Night
 The Temptations – Papa Was A Rollin' Stone
 Jackson 5 – Doctor My Eyes
 Jr Walker And The All Stars – Take Me Girl I'm Ready
 Gladys Knight And The Pips – The Look Of Love
 Jackson 5 – Hallelujah Day
 Diana Ross – Touch Me In The Morning
 Eddie Kendricks – Keep On Truckin' (Part 1)
 Diana Ross – All Of My Life
 Diana Ross And Marvin Gaye – You Are Everything

Volume 7

  Commodores – Machine Gun
  R. Dean Taylor – There's A Ghost In My House
  Syreeta – Your Kiss Is Sweet
  Frankie Valli & the Four Seasons – The Night
  The Miracles – Love Machine (Part 1)
  David Ruffin – Walk Away From Love
  Diana Ross – Theme From Mahogany (Do You Know Where You're Going To)
  Yvonne Fair – It Should Have Been Me  3:04
  Diana Ross – Love Hangover
  Thelma Houston – Don't Leave Me This Way
  Commodores – Easy
  Marvin Gaye – Got To Give It Up
  Commodores – Three Times A Lady
  Diana Ross – Gettin' Ready for Love
  Commodores – Sail On
  Billy Preston & Syreeta – With You I'm Born Again
  Commodores – Still
  Jermaine Jackson – Let's Get Serious

Volume 8

  Diana Ross – Upside Down
  Teena Marie – Behind The Groove
  Diana Ross – My Old Piano
  Diana Ross – I'm Coming Out
  Smokey Robinson – Being With You
  Diana Ross – It's My Turn
  Michael Jackson – One Day In Your Life
  Charlene – I've Never Been To Me
  Diana Ross & Lionel Richie – Endless Love
  Mary Jane Girls – All Night Long
  Rockwell – Somebody's Watching Me
  Michael Jackson – Farewell My Summer Love
  The Dazz Band – Let It All Blow
  The Temptations – Treat Her Like A Lady
  Commodores – Nightshift
  DeBarge – Rhythm Of The Night

Volume 9

  Rick James – Glow
  Mary Jane Girls – In My House
  Maureen Steele – Save The Night For Me
  Michael Lovesmith – Break The Ice
  Rockwell – Peeping Tom
  Willie Hutch – Keep On Jammin'
  The Dazz Band – Hotspot
  The Four Tops – Sexy Ways
  DeBarge – Who's Holding Donna Now
  Dennis Edwards – Coolin' Out

Other Motown Chartbusters

This version was released on the Telstar label in 1986; it is not part of the original series.

Track Listing

 The Supremes – You Keep Me Hangin' On
 Martha and the Vandellas – Dancing in the Street
 The Isley Brothers – This Old Heart of Mine (Is Weak for You)
 Marvin Gaye – I Heard it Through the Grapevine
 Four Tops – Reach Out, I'll Be There
 Stevie Wonder – For Once in My Life
 Marvin Gaye & Tammi Terrell – The Onion Song
 Edwin Starr – War
 Smokey Robinson and The Miracles – The Tears of a Clown
 The Supremes – Baby Love
 Jimmy Ruffin – What Becomes of the Brokenhearted
 Jackson 5 – I'll Be There
 Mary Wells – My Guy
 The Supremes & the Temptations – I'm Gonna Make You Love Me
 Four Tops – Walk Away Renee
 Diana Ross and Lionel Richie – Endless Love
 Michael Jackson – Ben
 The Temptations – Just My Imagination (Running Away with Me)
 Commodores – Still
 Diana Ross – I'm Still Waiting

See also
Hitsville U.S.A.
List of Motown No. 1 singles in the United States
List of Motown artists
List of record labels
Motown 1's
Music of Detroit
Motown
Universal Motown
Now That's What I Call Motown
Motown discography

References

External links
 Official Motown Records website
 Official Classic Motown website
 Motown Historical Museum – Open to the public, located in the former "Hitsville USA" building in Detroit
 Complete discography of pre-1986 Motown singles
 Complete discography of pre-1986 Motown albums
 "DFTMC" Don't Forget The Motor City
 "Motown Junkies"

Motown